Schroll is a surname. Notable people with the name include:
    
Al Schroll (1932–1999), American baseball pitcher
Bill Schroll (1926–2009), American football linebacker
Hannes Schroll (1909–1985), Austrian Alpine ski racer 
Savannah Schroll Guz (born 1974), American fiction writer, art critic and mixed-media artis
Thomas Schroll (born 1965), Austrian bobsledder